The 1999–2000 B Group was the forty-fourth season of the Bulgarian B Football Group, the second tier of the Bulgarian football league system. A total of 16 teams contested the league.

Cherno More Varna and Hebar-Iskar Pazardzhik were promoted to Bulgarian A Group. Etar Veliko Tarnovo, Antibiotic-Ludogorets Razgrad, Maritsa Plovdiv and Beroe 2000 Kazanlak were relegated.

League table 
<onlyinclude>

Promotion play-off

References

1999-2000
Bul
2